Blabia strandiella is a species of beetle in the family Cerambycidae. It was described by Breuning in 1943. It is known from Peru.

References

Blabia
Beetles described in 1943